Solar power in Montana on rooftops could provide 28% of all electricity used in Montana from 3,200 MW of solar panels.

Net metering is available to all consumers for up to at least 10 kW generation. Excess generation is rolled over each month but is lost once each year.

Statistics

See also

Wind power in Montana
Solar power in the United States
Renewable energy in the United States

References

External links
Incentives and policies

Energy in Montana
Montana